Southampton Spitfires  are an English university ice hockey and inline hockey club with teams that play in the British Universities Ice Hockey Association leagues: Division 1 (checking) South, Division 2 (checking) South and Division 1 (non-checking) and the British Roller Hockey Association league. The Spitfires Ice A team play their home games at Basingstoke Arena, the Spitfires Ice B and C team play their home games at Gosport Arena or Basingstoke Arena. The Spitfires Inline A and B team play their games at Solent Arena although the Inline B team does not currently play in league games. Due to the nature of the sport in the UK, the current rosters include players from; Southampton University, Southampton Solent University, University of Portsmouth, Chichester University and Bournemouth University.

Club honours
The club has seen recent success with titles in both Tier 1 and Tier 3 Nationals and Conference titles.

 2005 - 2006 
 BUIHA Division Two Southern Conference Champions

 2010 - 2011 
 BUIHA Division One Nationals Champions

 2011 - 2012 
 BUIHA Division Three Southern Conference Champions
 BUIHA Division Three Nationals Champions

 2012 - 2013 
 BUIHA Division One (Non-Checking) Southern Conference Champions
 BUIHA Division One (Non-Checking) Playoff / League Champions

 2013 - 2014 
 BUIHA Division One Nationals Champions

References

External links
 Southampton Spitfires Ice and Inline Hockey Club - official site
 Ice hockey league - British Universities Ice Hockey Association (BUIHA)- official site
 Inline Hockey League - British Roller Hockey Association (BRHA) - official site

Ice hockey teams in England
University ice hockey teams in England